Sunday PinaSaya is a Philippine television variety show broadcast by GMA Network. Hosted by Ai-Ai delas Alas, Marian Rivera, Wally Bayola and Jose Manalo, it premiered on August 9, 2015 on the network's Sunday Grande sa Hapon line up replacing Sunday All Stars. The show concluded on December 29, 2019 with a total of 226 episodes. It was replaced by All-Out Sundays in its timeslot.

Cast

Lead cast
 Ai-Ai delas Alas 
 Marian Rivera 
 Jose Manalo 
 Wally Bayola 

Supporting cast
 Alden Richards 
 Barbie Forteza 
 Julie Anne San Jose 
 Valeen Montenegro 
 Jerald Napoles 
 Joey Paras 
 Gladys Guevarra 
 Boobsie Wonderland 
 Atak 
 Gabbi Garcia 
 Andre Paras 
 Ruru Madrid 
 Mike "Pekto" Nacua 
 Kim Last 
 Lovely Abella 
 Ryzza Mae Dizon 
 Kyline Alcantara 
 Bianca Umali 
 Taki Saito 
 Miguel Tanfelix 
 Jak Roberto 
 Will Ashley 
 Bruce Roeland 
 Sofia Pablo 
 Kelvin Miranda

Ratings
According to AGB Nielsen Philippines' Mega Manila household television ratings, the pilot episode of Sunday PinaSaya earned a 22.7% rating.

Accolades

References

External links
 
 

2015 Philippine television series debuts
2019 Philippine television series endings
Filipino-language television shows
GMA Network original programming
Philippine variety television shows
Television series by APT Entertainment